Benton & Benton was an architectural partnership in eastern North Carolina of brothers Charles C. Benton Sr. and Frank W. Benton.  Several of its works are listed on the U.S. National Register of Historic Places.  Charles C. Benton Jr. and others also worked for the firm.

Works include:
Bowers–Tripp House, 1040 N. Market St., Washington, NC (Benton & Benton), NRHP-listed
Canton Main Street Historic District, Bounded roughly by Park St., Main St., Bridge St., and Adams St., Canton, NC (Benton & Benton), NRHP-listed
Cherry Hotel, 333 E. Nash St. 	Wilson 	NC (Benton, Charles Collins), NRHP-listed
Colonial Theater, 55-57 Park St., Canton, NC (Benton & Benton), NRHP-listed
First Colony Inn, 6720 S. Virginia Dare Trail, Nags Head, NC (Benton, Frank), NRHP-listed
 Greenville Municipal Building (1929) in the Greenville Commercial Historic District.
Halifax County Home and Tubercular Hospital, NC 903, Halifax, NC  (Benton & Benton), NRHP-listed
Lenoir High School, 100 Willow St., Lenoir, NC (Benton & Benton), NRHP-listed
M & O Chevrolet Company, 412 W. Russell St., Fayetteville, NC (Benton, Frank), NRHP-listed
Walter McCanless House, 200 Confederate Ave., Salisbury, NC (Benton and Benton of Wilson NC), NRHP-listed
Montgomery County Courthouse, E. Main St. between S. Main and S. Pearl Sts., Troy, NC (Benton & Benton), NRHP-listed
North Carolina School for the Deaf Historic District, Jct. US 70 and US 64, Morganton, NC (Benton, Charles C.), NRHP-listed
Oakmont, 2909 S. Memorial Dr., Greenville, NC (Benton and Benton), NRHP-listed
Washington County Courthouse, Main and Adams Sts., Plymouth, NC (Benton & Benton), NRHP-listed
One or more works in Downtown Main Street Historic District, roughly the 800 and 900 Blks of Main St., North Wilkesboro, NC (Benton and Benton), NRHP-listed
One or more works in Farmville Historic District, roughly bounded by Turnage, Pine, Jones, and Waverly Sts., Farmville, NC (Benton & Benton), NRHP-listed
One or more works in Ayden Historic District, roughly bounded by Verna St., Peachtree St., E. College St. and Planters St., Ayden, NC (Benton & Benton Associates), NRHP-listed
One or more works in Queen–Gordon Streets Historic District, roughly N. Queen and Gordon Sts., Kinston, NC (Benton & Benton), NRHP-listed
One or more works in Williamston Commercial Historic District, roughly, areas surrounding the 100 blocks of E. Main, W. Main and S. Smithwick Sts. and the 200 block of Washington St., Williamston, NC (Benton, Charles Collins), NRHP-listed
One or more works in Williamston Historic District, roughly bounded by Franklin, Harrell, Williams, South Haughton, North Railroad, Roberson, and White Sts., Williamston, NC (Benton, Charles C.; Benton, Frank W.), NRHP-listed

References

Architecture firms based in North Carolina
Defunct architecture firms of the United States